Stegnaster wesseli is a sea star of the family Echinasteridae, found around the Bahamas and in the Caribbean, from Florida to the Yucatan including the Gulf of Mexico.

References
 
 

Asterinidae
Starfish described in 1875